The 11th Alabama Infantry Regiment was an infantry regiment that served in the Confederate Army during the American Civil War.

Service
The 11th Alabama Infantry Regiment was mustered in at Lynchburg, Virginia, on June 17, 1861.  Some of the companies making up the regiment had been already in service for several months at the time of mustering.  The regiment surrendered  at Appomattox Court House. The colors of the 11th Alabama Infantry were captured at the Battle of Antietam by the 57th New York Volunteers and was later one of 19 captured rebel flags stored in General McClellan's tent before being delivered to the U.S. War Department in October 1862.

Total strength and casualties
The 11th mustered 1192 men during its existence.  The regiment suffered approximately 270  killed in action or mortally wounded and 200 men who died of disease, for a total of approximately 470 fatalities.  An additional 170 men were discharged from the regiment and 80 were transferred to other units.

Commanders
 Colonel Sydenham Moore
 Colonel John C. C. Sanders
 Colonel George Edward Tayloe

See also
Alabama Civil War Confederate Units
Alabama in the American Civil War

Notes

References

Units and formations of the Confederate States Army from Alabama
1861 establishments in Alabama
Military units and formations established in 1861